Struan Douglas Dewar (born 6 July 1989) is a Scottish rugby union player.

He was a member of the Scotland national rugby sevens team between 2008-2015.  Outwith those commitments he was available to play for Edinburgh Rugby.

Career
Struan Dewar has played for Scotland at various age-group levels including the Under 20 2009 IRB Junior World Championship in Japan in which he played all five matches. He has played in numerous international tournaments for the Scotland sevens team including the IRB Sevens World Series.

As of 2015/16 he plays for Heriot's in the Scottish Premiership.

References

1989 births
Living people
People educated at Strathallan School
Scottish rugby union players
Male rugby sevens players
Heriot's RC players
Edinburgh Rugby players
Scotland international rugby sevens players